Cromby is an unincorporated community in East Pikeland Township, Chester County, Pennsylvania, United States. The now closed Cromby Power Plant is located in Cromby, at an elevation  of 118 Feet above MSL. Cromby was also home to Cromby station for the Pennsylvania Railroad. The station was demolished in 1967.

References

Populated places on the Schuylkill River
Unincorporated communities in Chester County, Pennsylvania
Unincorporated communities in Pennsylvania